South Pacific in Hi-Fi is an album by drummer and bandleader Chico Hamilton featuring jazz interpretations of themes from the Broadway musical South Pacific. It was released in 1958 on the Pacific Jazz label.

Reception

AllMusic rated the album 3 stars.

Track listing
All compositions by Richard Rodgers and Oscar Hammerstein II
 "A Wonderful Guy" - 3:12
 "This Nearly Was Mine" - 3:45
 "Dites Moi" - 2:57
 "Some Enchanted Evening" - 3:13
 "Bali Ha'i" - 4:42
 "There Is Nothing Like a Dame" - 3:00
 "Younger Than Springtime" - 3:27
 "Happy Talk" - 2:55
 "A Cockeyed Optimist" - 1:50
 "Honey Bun" - 4:17
 "I'm Gonna Wash That Man Right Outa My Hair" - 2:35

Personnel
Chico Hamilton - drums
Paul Horn - alto saxophone, flute, arranger
Fred Katz - cello, arranger
John Pisano - guitar, arranger 
Hal Gaylor - bass
Calvin Jackson, Carson Smith - arranger

References 

World Pacific Records albums
Chico Hamilton albums
1958 albums